The 2019–20 Ukrainian Premier League season was the 29th top-level football club competitions since the fall of the Soviet Union and the 12th since the establishment of the Ukrainian Premier League.

The tournament has been set to start on 28 July 2019. The same day there took place the game for the Ukrainian Super Cup. The UPL General Assembly also adopted a post season play-off mini-tournament for the last fifth berth of Ukraine in the 2020–21 UEFA Europa League competition which would involve the best team(s) of the relegation group. The assembly also agreed to implement the Video assistant referee (VAR) position in 2020. With the ongoing competition, on 7 August 2019 the league adopted new name FavBet Liha after its main sponsor as well as its new logo. For promotional purpose, the Ukrainian Premier League introduced an own copy of virtual fantasy league on the Real Manager game platform.

The defending champion was the 12-times winner Shakhtar Donetsk. On 20 June 2020, Shakhtar won the league again by beating Oleksandriya in the Round 27 home game gaining its 13th title record five rounds before the finish.

Competition prolongation caused by the emergency break introduced due to the COVID-19 pandemic made the season the longest in history, lasting 1 year and 1 day in total. The season also has set a record as a highest-scoring season in the history of the competition, with an average of 2.78 goals scored per game.

Summary
For next 2020–21 season, Ukrainian Premier League will expand to 14 teams. The lowest ranked team from Ukrainian Premier League will get relegated to Ukrainian First League. However, the top three teams from Ukrainian First League will gain promotion to Ukrainian Premier League next season.

Due to the COVID-19 pandemic in Ukraine and based on resolutions of the Cabinet of Ukraine and the UAF Executive Committee, on 11 March 2020 the UPL adopted a decision to conduct games of the league's championship as well as under-21 and under-19 championships without spectators until 3 April 2020 (the first two rounds of the season's second stage).

On 17 March 2020, the Ukrainian Association of Football adopted its decision to pause all football competitions in the country since 18 March 2020 for unspecified period of time (until adaptation of its next decision to resume all football events) due to the coronavirus pandemic. On 14 May 2020 in the House of Football took place a working conference between leaders of UAF and UPL with representatives of the UPL club where it was decided not to renew competitions among U-21 and U-19 teams. The decision was approved on 27 May 2020 by the UAF Executive Committee. On 26 May 2020 the Ministry of Healthcare granted its permission to conduct games of the Favbet Liha and the Ukrainian Cup without spectators starting 30 May 2020 and the UAF Executive Committee supported the decision to renew the Championship and the Ukrainian Cup from 30 May 2020. Next day the Ministry of Health Care updated some of its restricting recommendations in regards to coordination of competitions among professional clubs.

On 22 July 2020 Ministry of Healthcare granted the permission to allow spectators on the Europa League play-off matches in a test mode, with up to 25% of stadium capacity open for attending.

The term of the UPL president expired on 5 April 2020. Due to pandemic situation worldwide, the election of the League's president was postponed to 27 April 2020. The current president Thomas Grimm stated that he will not run for the post as the members of the league are not interested to work together. On 4 May 2020 the league's executive director Yevhen Dykyi announced that there were registered three candidates for elections of the UPL president. On 18 May 2020 the league announced that elections for the league's president were postponed and their date will be announced later. Until then as the UPL president is acting the league's executive director Yevhen Dykyi.

Teams

Promoted teams 
 SC Dnipro-1 – the champion of the 2018–19 Ukrainian First League  (debut)
 Kolos Kovalivka – 2nd place of the 2018–19 Ukrainian First League, play-off winners (debut)

Other issues 
 Olimpik Donetsk's participation in the season was under question because both of its youth teams (U-21 and U-19) were expelled from the Ukrainian Premier League due to match fixing, and are banned from competitions until the end of 2019–20 season.

Location map 
The following displays the location of teams.

Stadiums 
Three teams play their matches outside of home towns. The minimum threshold for the stadium's capacity in the UPL is 5,000 (Article 10, paragraph 7.2).

Due to COVID-19 restrictions, after quarantine break clubs from Lviv were forced to conduct all their home matches in the other regions until the Round 30.

The following stadiums are regarded as home grounds (clubs in bold indicate that the respective stadium was their main home ground during the season):

Notes:

 The Round 19 game between Dynamo and Vorskla was played on February 22, 2020 at the Dynamo Stadium imeni Lobanovskoho becoming a historical mark when there first was implemented the system of video assistant referee (VAR).
 Due to critical situation in the city of Lviv with the ongoing COVID-19 pandemic, the Lviv city club's do not play at home from Round 24 till Round 30.

Personnel and sponsorship 

Notes:

Managerial changes

First stage

First stage table

First stage results
Teams play each other twice on a home and away basis, before the league split into two groups – the top six and the bottom six.

Notes:

First stage positions by round 
The following table represents the teams position after each round in the competition played chronologically.

Championship round

Championship round table

Championship round results

Championship round positions by round

Relegation round

Relegation round table

Relegation round results

Notes:

Relegation round positions by round

Play-offs for qualification to the UEFA Europa League 
Teams that placed 5th and 6th in the Championship group with the teams placed 7th and 8th in the Relegation group played the one-leg play-off for one more berth in the Europa League second qualifying round. Winners of the semi-final pairs contested in one-leg final game the last berth to the UEFA Europa League. If the winners of the 2019–20 Ukrainian Cup Dynamo Kyiv hadn't already clinched the berth to the European competitions by the league performance, the play-off would have been set among teams placed 4th, 5th and 6th in the Championship group and 7th in the Relegation group in the same way.

Kolos Kovalivka won the play-off on 29 July 2020 after defeating FC Mariupol 1–0 after the extra time in the final.

Semi-finals

Final

Season statistics

Top goalscorers

Top assistants

Clean sheets

Hat-tricks

Attendance 
The ranking is sorted by average attendance, while "Pos" column indicates position of each team in tournament standings.

Awards

Monthly awards

Round awards

Season awards
The laureates of the 2019–20 UPL season were:
 Best player:  Taison (Shakhtar Donetsk)
 Best coach:  Viktor Skrypnyk (Zorya Luhansk)
 Best goalkeeper:  Andriy Pyatov (Shakhtar Donetsk)
 Best arbiter:  Kateryna Monzul (Kharkiv)
 Best young player:  Vladyslav Supriaha (Dynamo Kyiv)
 Best goalscorer:  Júnior Moraes (Shakhtar Donetsk)
 Fair Play award: Desna Chernihiv

Number of teams by region 

By representation

By home stadium

See also 
 2019–20 Ukrainian First League
 2019–20 Ukrainian Second League
 2019–20 Ukrainian Football Amateur League
 2019–20 Ukrainian Cup
 List of Ukrainian football transfers summer 2019
 List of Ukrainian football transfers winter 2019–20

Notes

References

External links 
 Official website of the Ukrainian Premier League
 News, stats, updates. campeones.ua.

Ukrainian Premier League seasons
1
Ukr
Ukrainian